[[File:Photo_Paolo_Villa_VR_2016_(VT)_F0163961trisbis_Palazzo_Vitelleschi,_cavalli_alati_bardati,_scultura_etrusca_ellenistica,_dettaglio_ged-horses of Tarquinia, one of the most representative works of Etruscan Art.]]

The high-relief of the "Tarquinia Winged Horses" is a fragment of the colonnade that supported the pediment of the most important temple of the ancient Etruscan city of Tarquínia, at the Ara della Regina, better known as the Major Temple of Tarquínia. Nowadays situated at the Province of Viterbo (region of Lazio, Italy)

Its realization dates back to the middle of the 4th century BC, although some researchers argued that it could be more recent, because only after the 3rd century BC Etruscan builders gave the temples a particular change in the decoration of the friezes and pediments.

Symbology 
In spite of the stylistic influence of the classic Greek art, this set can not be identified with the only winged horse of Greek mythology, Pegasus, or with the horses that threw the car of Apollo. Therefore, it is a work of a purely decorative character, adapted to the Etruscan world. The image of winged horses has become the symbol and emblem of contemporary region of Tarquinia.

Conservation 
The relief is permanently exposed to the Tarquinia National Museum. It is part of an archaeological complex that began to work in the mid-twentieth century.

References

External links 

 The National Archaeological Museum of Tarquinia.

Etruscan art
Tarquinia
Winged horses